Homalopoma nana is a species of a minute sea snail, a marine gastropod mollusc in the family Colloniidae.

Distribution 
This species occurs in New Zealand.

Original description 
Homalopoma nana was originally discovered and described as Argalista nana by Harold John Finlay in 1930. Finlay's original text (the type description) reads as follows:

References
This article incorporates public domain text coming from New Zealand from reference.

Colloniidae
Gastropods described in 1930
Taxa named by Harold John Finlay